Diospyros clementium is a tree in the family Ebenaceae. The tree is named for American husband-and-wife plant collectors Joseph Clemens and Mary Strong Clemens. Habitat is mixed dipterocarp forests from sea level to  altitude. D. clementium is endemic to Borneo.

References

clementium
Plants described in 1933
Endemic flora of Borneo
Trees of Borneo